Marek Ujlaky (born 26 March 1974) is a Slovak former footballer who played as a midfielder and spent most of his career with Spartak Trnava.

External links

Living people
1974 births
Slovak footballers
Slovak expatriate footballers
People from Trnava District
Sportspeople from the Trnava Region
Association football midfielders
Slovakia international footballers
Slovak Super Liga players
FC Spartak Trnava players
ŠK Slovan Bratislava players
FK Drnovice players
FC Senec players
FC ViOn Zlaté Moravce players
Slovak expatriate sportspeople in the Czech Republic
Expatriate footballers in the Czech Republic
Slovak expatriate sportspeople in Austria
Expatriate footballers in Austria